Serbian war crimes  may refer to:

 Expulsion of the Albanians 1877–1878
 Serbian war crimes in the Balkan Wars
 Serbian war crimes in the Yugoslav Wars